was a tozama feudal domain under the Tokugawa shogunate of Edo period Japan.  It is located in Echigo Province, Honshū. The domain was centered at Shibata Castle, located in what is now the city of Shibata in Niigata Prefecture. It was ruled for all of its history by the Mizoguchi clan.

History

Mizoguchi Hidekatsu was a general under Oda Nobunaga and subsequently Toyotomi Hideyoshi. He distinguished himself at a number of battles and was rewarded with a 60,000 koku holding in Echigo Province. During the Battle of Sekigahara, he sided with Tokugawa Ieyasu; however as Echigo Province had many supporters and former retainers of the Uesugi clan, he was ordered to remain in Echigo on guard duty. After the establishment of the Tokugawa Shogunate, he was confirmed in his existing holdings, which extended across the Echigo Plain between the Agano River and the Shinano River. This area, which stretched from eastern Niigata City, through Agano, Kamo and Minamikanbara District was excellent rice land, and the actual revenues of the domain were far in excess of its official kokudaka.

The second daimyō of Shibata, Mizoguchi Nobukatsu, split a 12,000 koku holding off of the domain for his younger brother, creating , which lasted to 1687. The  kokudaka of the domain was reduced from 60,000 to 50,000 with the remaining 2,000 coming from new rice lands developed within the domain. Nobukatsu was very active in developing new lands, and an additional 15,500 koku were splint amongst his three younger sons on his death, leaving the main 50,000 koku holding intact for his heir. The 8th daimyō, Mizoguchi Naoyasu established a Han school and invited noted gardeners from Edo and Kyoto as part of his rebuilding of the castle town. The 10th daimyō, Mizoguchi Naoaki, successfully petitioned the shogunate for an increase in kokudaka from 50,000 to 100,000 koku, although there was considerable debate within the domain as to whether or not the increased taxation was worth the increase in prestige and status.

During the Boshin War, the 12th daimyō, Mizoguchi Naomasa joined the Ōuetsu Reppan Dōmei;  however, there was extensive opposition within the domain, and he was forced to quickly switch sides to the imperial cause.

In July 1871, with the abolition of the han system, Shibata Domain briefly became Shibata Prefecture, and was merged into the newly created Niigata Prefecture. Under the new Meiji government, Mizoguchi Naomasa was given the kazoku peerage title of hakushaku (count), and later served as a member of the House of Peers

Bakumatsu period holdings
As with most domains in the han system, Shibata Domain consisted of several discontinuous territories calculated to provide the assigned kokudaka, based on periodic cadastral surveys and projected agricultural yields.

Echigo Province
512 villages in Kanbara District
Mutsu Province (Iwashiro)
8 villages in Shinobu District

List of daimyō

See also 
 List of Han
 Abolition of the han system

References

External links
 "Shibata" at Edo 300 

History of Niigata Prefecture
Domains of Japan
Echigo Province
Hokuriku region
Mizoguchi clan
Shibata, Niigata